Châteaubleau is a commune in the Seine-et-Marne département in the Île-de-France région in north-central France.

It is located 16 km west of Provins and 9.5 km north east of Nangis. The inhabitants are called Castelblotins.

See also
 Communes of the Seine-et-Marne department

References

External links

 1999 Land Use, from IAURIF (Institute for Urban Planning and Development of the Paris-Île-de-France région) 
 

Communes of Seine-et-Marne